Starowice may refer to the following places in Poland:
Starowice, Brzeg County in Opole Voivodeship (south-west Poland)
Starowice, Nysa County in Opole Voivodeship (south-west Poland)
Starowice, West Pomeranian Voivodeship (north-west Poland)